Rokhan Zarmalwal is an Afghan cricketer. He made his List A debut for Speen Ghar Region in the 2017 Ghazi Amanullah Khan Regional One Day Tournament on 11 August 2017. He made his first-class debut for Band-e-Amir Region in the 2019 Ahmad Shah Abdali 4-day Tournament on 21 December 2019.

References

External links
 

Living people
Afghan cricketers
Band-e-Amir Dragons cricketers
Spin Ghar Tigers cricketers
Place of birth missing (living people)
Year of birth missing (living people)